The 1971 NCAA University Division baseball tournament was played at the end of the 1971 NCAA University Division baseball season to determine the national champion of college baseball.  The tournament concluded with eight teams competing in the College World Series, a double-elimination tournament in its twenty-fifth year.  Eight regional districts sent representatives to the College World Series with preliminary rounds within each district serving to determine each representative.  These events would later become known as regionals.  Each district had its own format for selecting teams, resulting in 23 teams participating in the tournament at the conclusion of their regular season, and in some cases, after a conference tournament.  The twenty-fifth tournament's champion was Southern California, coached by Rod Dedeaux.  The Most Outstanding Player was Jerry Tabb of Tulsa.

Tournament
The opening rounds of the tournament were played across eight district sites across the country, each consisting of between two and four teams. The winners of each District advanced to the College World Series.

Bold indicates winner.

District 1 at Cambridge, Massachusetts

District 2 at Princeton, NJ

District 3 at Gastonia, NC

District 4 at East Lansing, MI

District 5 at Tulsa, OK

District 6 at Austin, TX

District 7 at Provo, UT

District 8 at Santa Clara, CA & Los Angeles

College World Series

Participants

Results

Bracket

Game results

All-Tournament Team
The following players were members of the All-Tournament Team.

Notable players
 BYU: Dane Iorg
 Harvard: Pete Varney
 Mississippi State: Bob Myrick
 Seton Hall: 
 Southern California: Steve Busby, Fred Lynn, Eric Raich, Randy Scarbery
 Southern Illinois: Jim Dwyer, Mike Eden, Duane Kuiper, Dan Thomas
 Texas–Pan American: Wayne Tyrone, Jim Tyrone
 Tulsa: Steve Bowling, Mardie Cornejo, Steve Rogers, Mike Sember, Jerry Tabb

See also
 1971 NCAA College Division baseball tournament
 1971 NAIA World Series

References

NCAA Division I Baseball Championship
1971 NCAA University Division baseball season
Baseball in Austin, Texas